Radio Televisión Martí is an American state-run radio and television international broadcaster based in Miami, Florida, financed by the federal government of the United States through the U.S. Agency for Global Media (formerly Broadcasting Board of Governors, BBG). It transmits news in Spanish to Cuba and its broadcasts can also be heard and viewed worldwide through their website and on shortwave radio frequencies.

Named after the Cuban national hero and intellectual José Martí, Radio Televisión Martí was established in 1983 and TV Martí was added in 1990. The 2014 budget for the Cuba broadcasting program was approximately US$27 million.

Radio y Televisión Martí is overseen by the Office of Cuba Broadcasting (OCB).

Radio Televisión Martí is an element of the International Broadcasting Bureau (IBB).

Radio Martí

History
In the early 1980s, the U.S. Government planned to create a radio station to be known as Radio Free Cuba, modeled on Radio Free Europe/Radio Liberty, the mission of fighting communism in the hope of hastening the fall of Cuban President Fidel Castro. The station – renamed Radio Martí after Cuban writer José Martí, who had fought for Cuba's independence from Spain and against U.S. influence in the Americas – was established in 1983 by President Ronald Reagan at the urging of Jorge Mas Canosa. Existing North American broadcasters objected strenuously to the establishment of Radio Martí, fearing that its broadcasts would lead Cuba to retaliate by jamming existing commercial medium-wave broadcasts from Florida.

On May 20, 1985, Radio Martí began broadcasts to Cuba from the United States. The first day of broadcasting was chosen to commemorate the 83rd anniversary of Cuba's independence from United States rule on May 20, 1902. The fears of broadcasters proved well-founded, when Cuba-based transmitters briefly broadcast powerful signals on the medium-wave band in 1985, disrupting U.S. AM radio station broadcasts in several states.  Cuba continues to broadcast interference against U.S. broadcasts specifically directed to Cuba in attempts to prevent them from being received within Cuba.

After the collapse of the Soviet Union at the end of 1991, the budget for all U.S.-government-run foreign broadcasters, with the exception of Radio Martí, was sharply reduced. In 1996, Radio Martís studios were moved from Washington, D.C.  to Miami, Florida. The move, in addition to placing the station's studios closer to its target audience, also underscored its growing independence from the Voice of America, another U.S.-government-run foreign broadcaster with which Radio Martí had previously shared studios.

Today
Today, Radio Marti broadcasts a 24-hour radio program over short-wave transmitters in Delano, California, and Greenville, North Carolina, and a medium-wave transmitter in Marathon, Florida. Its studios are located in Miami, Florida. Cuba jams both the medium-wave and shortwave signals, but the shortwave program is heard in Canada and throughout Central and South America. On occasion, the medium-wave transmitter at 1180 kHz can be heard as far north as Washington, D.C.

Two hours of Radio Martí's news programs are carried each night, 10:00 PM to midnight local time, by Miami's WSUA (Caracol 1260 AM). It is also available at various times to subscribers of SiriusXM Satellite Radio on its bilingual channel 153, La Politica Talk. Additionally, Radio Marti is streamed live on radiotelevisionmarti.com and for users of the Radio Televisión Martí App available on iTunes and Android.

Radio Martí operates with about 100 employees and a budget of $15 million. Its mission, in its own words, is to provide "a contrast to Cuban media and provide its listeners with an uncensored view of current events." Former prisoners in Cuba and Cuban exiles often speak on Radio Martí, and on Saturdays a Spanish-language version of the U.S. president's weekly radio address, as well as the opposition's response, are transmitted.

Assessments
There is much debate about the effectiveness of these broadcasts. As with Radio Free Europe during the Cold War, there is no way to judge the station's true audience through the usual listener surveys. Thus, the actual number of listeners is open to speculation. However, after the fall of the communist Soviet satellite governments of Eastern Europe in 1989 and of the Soviet Union itself at the end of 1991, a Hoover Institution conference reviewing reports from citizens in newly independent Russia, Poland, Czechoslovakia, Hungary, and other countries tended to substantiate the effectiveness of RFE and U.S. Voice of America broadcasts both in providing information and bolstering pro-liberal democracy movements within those countries, despite attempts at electronic jamming and counter-propaganda, and supporters of Radio Martí hope that it is achieving similar success in Cuba.

The watchdog group Cuban Americans for Engagement (CAFE) has been critical of the radio and television station for broadcasts critical of warming relations and cooperative efforts with U.S. organizations. A report by the Committee on Foreign Relations in 2010 stated that less than 2 percent of Cubans listen in. U.S. Senator Mark Pryor (D-Arkansas) and U.S. House of Representatives member Betty McCollum introduced the Stop Wasting Taxpayer Money on Cuba Broadcasting Act to shut the stations down. The Alliance for Responsible Cuba Policy has also been critical of the stations.

TV Martí

History
In 1990, the U.S. Government created TV Martí to broadcast television programming to Cuba. It began broadcasting on March 27, 1990, beaming daily programs in Spanish via a transmitter affixed to an aerostat balloon – nicknamed "Fat Albert" by people in the area – tethered 10,000 feet (3,048 m) above Cudjoe Key, Florida. Weather affected the broadcasts; "Fat Albert" sometimes was hauled down because of high winds, once broke loose and drifted into the Everglades in 1991, and was destroyed by Hurricane Dennis in 2005. After the aerostats destruction, TV Martí in October 2006 began to use fixed-wing aircraft to transmit its signals, first a military C-130 Hercules which proved too expensive to operate, and then a Gulfstream twin engine airplane flying a figure-eight pattern off Key West, Florida. One of these aircraft has since been retired.

The first TV Martí broadcasts took place in the very early morning hours to avoid interference with Cuban domestic television programming. This combined with Cuban jamming of the signal has led to low viewership of TV Martí in Cuba, where, according to a U.S. official who was stationed in Havana in the stations early days, it is known as La TV que no se ve ("The TV that can't be seen"). U.S. Government telephone surveys in 1990, 2003, 2006, and 2008 reported Cuban viewership of TV Martí of less than one percent; the U.S. Government ceased the surveys after 2008, claiming that obtaining accurate Cuban domestic television viewership statistics was too difficult.

Despite the frequent reports of its low viewership in Cuba, TV Martís defenders cited continuing Cuban government jamming of its signal as evidence of its importance, and U.S. Government funding of it continued, with TV Martí broadcasting daily programs in Spanish. In 2012, the administration of President Barack Obama finally asked the United States Congress to cease funding of the program, but Congress nonetheless continued to provide money for it.

TV Martí today

Like Radio Martí, TV Martí is an element of the International Broadcasting Bureau. TV Marti airs half-hour early and late evening newscasts which a low-power Miami television channel, WGEN-LD, Virtual digital Channel 8.1 (RF digital Channel 8.1), carries along with other programming. The pay-TV platform DirecTV, which is pirated by many people in Cuba, also carries TV Martí.

In May 2013, the U.S. Congress finally eliminated funding for the operation of Aero Martí, the lone aircraft still committed to TV Martí broadcasts. However, funding for the preservation and maintenance of the plane continues, and it remains in storage in a hangar in Cartersville, Georgia, ready to return to service if funding of its operations resumes.

Controversy and legality
Fabio Leite, Deputy Director of the Radiocommunications Office of the International Telecommunication Union (ITU), has condemned radio and television transmissions to Cuba from the United States as illegal and inadmissible and more so when they are designed to foment internal subversion on the island. The director emphasized that this constant U.S. attack is in violation of ITU regulations, which stipulate that radio transmissions within commercial broadcasting on medium wave, FM, or television must be conceived of as a good quality national service within the limits of the country concerned. The Cuban government also has insisted the penetration of their airwaves violates international law. This claim has not been elucidated; however, Cuba responds to these broadcasts by jamming the signals.

The Radio Martí broadcasts are directed at Cuba, but can be picked up throughout North, Central, and South America when Cuba is not jamming them. However, Radio Martí programs cannot be specifically directed at U.S. citizens under the same law that restricts Voice of America broadcasts.

On November 15, 2007, delegates to the World Radiocommunication Conference 2007 declared illegal the U.S. government's use of airplanes to beam the signals of Washington-funded Radio y Televisión Martí into Cuba, stating "A radio broadcasting station that functions on board an aircraft and transmits only to the territory of another administration without its agreement cannot be considered in conformity with the radio communications regulations."

A report by the U.S. Government Accountability Office accuses the station of engaging in political propaganda in the forms of editorializing, use of offensive and incendiary language in broadcasts, use of unsubstantiated reports coming from Cuba, and presentation of individual views as news. The claims of unprofessionalism are strongly rejected by the station's management. National Public Radio's On the Media programme has pointed out that while "the U.S. has spent close to a half billion dollars on TV and Radio Martí, the Cuban government has managed to effectively block the transmission signal, at least on the TV side. Viewership on the island is estimated to be a third of one percent. One study several years ago found that nine out of ten Cubans had never even heard of the channel."

According to a January 10, 2007 episode of the news and commentary program Democracy Now!, the watchdog group Citizens for Responsibility and Ethics (CRE) called for a congressional investigation into the legality of broadcasting Radio and TV Martí over commercial airwaves from southern Florida. The group states that the Bush administration has reached an agreement with two south Florida commercial Spanish-language TV and radio stations to broadcast the TV Martí program, which the CRE accuses the US government of illegally paying the station $200,000 to air the Radio Martí program daily for six months, citing that U.S law prohibits broadcasting of propaganda inside the country.

Democracy Now! went on to state that a senior TV Martí executive was indicted by federal prosecutors for providing kickbacks in trade for certain contracts and the inspector generals office has launched a review into the operations of the Office of Cuba Broadcasting which oversees Martí. In addition, the program indicates that Massachusetts Congressman William Delahunt has also promised to hold hearings on TV Martí.

Other critics consider the actual ineffectiveness to reach a Cuban audience, the risk of the broadcaster's purposes for heavy budget-cuts and the fear of limited editorial independence in order to be manipulated by right-wing Cuban exiles and their political agenda for personal political gain.

On September 28, 2015, at his first speech ever to the United Nations General Assembly, President Raúl Castro demanded an end to "anti-government radio and television broadcasts".

In May 2018 Martí broadcast video segments attacking George Soros as a "multimillionaire Jew of Hungarian origin" threatening Latin American democracy. The videos were based on assertions by Judicial Watch. In October 2018 the employees responsible for producing the videos were placed on administrative leave pending an investigation into their conduct.

See also
 Radio Free Dixie (a Cuban-based program directed at the United States)
 WRMI. (Radio Miami International), a commercial shortwave radio station targeting Cuba

References

External links
 Voice of America
 Radio Free Europe/Radio Liberty
 Voz de America
 Martí Noticias, Radio y Televisión Martí official website (in Spanish).
 Martí News Official website.
 Radio Martí and TV Martí pages on YouTube.

United States government propaganda organizations
International broadcasters
Marti
Cuba–United States relations
Opposition to Fidel Castro
Mass media in Miami
1985 establishments in Florida
Radio stations established in 1985
Television channels and stations established in 1990
Shortwave radio stations in the United States
State media
United States propaganda in Cuba
Anti-communist propaganda
Anti-communist organizations in the United States
Spanish-language radio stations in Florida
Spanish-language television stations in Florida